Tiffany Ann Cole (born December 3, 1981) is an American convicted murderer who was found guilty of the kidnapping and first-degree murder of a Duval County, Florida husband and wife and sentenced to death. Also found guilty in the case were three men: Alan Wade; Bruce Nixon; and Cole's boyfriend, Michael Jackson. Prosecutors said Cole and the three men developed a plan to kidnap and kill the couple to steal their money, and dug a grave for them in Charlton County, Georgia, two days before knocking on their door and asking to use the phone. As of February 2015, Cole is the third youngest woman on death row in the United States; she was 26 at the time of her conviction.

Crime 
Tiffany Cole was a familiar face to Carol and Reggie Sumner since her family had been neighbors to the 61-year-old couple in South Carolina. When the Sumners moved to Jacksonville, Florida, in March 2005, they sold a car to Cole. Cole agreed to make monthly payments and often drove to Jacksonville with friends.

In June 2005, Cole and her new boyfriend, Michael James Jackson, drove to Jacksonville to complete the paperwork on the car. While there, they stayed at the Sumner home. While staying with the couple, Jackson began hatching a plan to rob the couple and steal money from their bank accounts.

In early July 2005, Tiffany Cole, Michael Jackson, and two other men, Alan Wade and Bruce Nixon, drove to the Sumners' home. Wade and Nixon went to the door and asked to use the phone. Once inside, Wade and Nixon attacked. The Sumners were bound and gagged with duct tape, put into the trunk of their Lincoln Town Car, and driven across the border to a remote part of Georgia. Cole and Jackson traveled separately in their car, planning to get deliberately pulled over for speeding if the police got too close to the Lincoln. Once in Georgia, the Sumners were forced to reveal the personal identification numbers of their bank accounts. The couple, blindfolded and bound, was pushed into a pre-dug grave and buried alive by Wade and Nixon.

Cole subsequently pawned jewelry and other items stolen from the Sumners' home, and the ATM card was used to obtain more than $1000 in cash. Three of the group were tracked back to a hotel in South Carolina by the use of the ATM card and arrested there. After being arrested Nixon willingly led police to the Sumners' grave, revealing that both victims had managed to free themselves of their bonds, but could only manage to hug each other in their final moments before they died.

Conviction
At Cole's week-long trial in October 2007, the jury deliberated for less than 90 minutes before finding her guilty of first-degree murder. They voted 9-3 that she should receive the death penalty. Evidence included photos of Cole and two co-defendants in a limousine, celebrating with champagne and hands full of cash.

Five months later, a judge handed down two death sentences for the murders, and a sentence of life in prison for the kidnappings. She awaits execution at Lowell Correctional Institution Annex.

Cole is one of three women currently on Florida's death row, the others being Margaret Allen and Tina Brown, each sentenced to death in unrelated murders.

Wade and Jackson also received death sentences. Nixon, who had led police to the bodies and testified against the others, pleaded guilty to second-degree murder and was sentenced to 45 years in prison.

In 2017, the Florida Supreme Court ordered new sentencing hearings for Cole, Wade, and Jackson, because their juries had not unanimously recommended the death penalty.  A 2016 U.S Supreme Court ruling, Hurst v. Florida, found that Florida's prior law permitting non-unanimous jury verdicts in death penalty cases violated the Sixth Amendment, prompting Florida to resentence more than 150 convicted felons. In June 2022, Wade was resentenced to life in prison with no chance of parole.

Documentaries 
Due to the brutality and notoriety of the case and the fact that one of the perpetrators was a young woman later sentenced to death, the case has been the subject of several TV documentaries. Including the second season, third episode of Your Worst Nightmare, and an hour-long interview of Tiffany Cole and Emilia Carr with Diane Sawyer for 20/20 in 2015 and Wicked Attraction, "Good Deeds Punished" in 2010, and a episode of MrBallens YouTube channel/podcast where he dives thoroughly into the case and the killers.

See also 
 Capital punishment in Florida
 List of death row inmates in the United States
 List of women executed in the United States since 1976
 List of women on death row in the United States

References

External links
Florida Supreme Court affirmation of Alan Wade's death sentences, May 6, 2010
Inmate Population Information Detail - Tiffany Cole
Profile of Tiffany Cole at about.com

1981 births
2005 murders in the United States
American female criminals
American female murderers
American people convicted of kidnapping
American people convicted of murder
American people convicted of robbery
American prisoners sentenced to death
Criminals from South Carolina
Living people
People convicted of murder by Florida
Prisoners sentenced to death by Florida
Women sentenced to death